The Artists' Union of the USSR was a creative union of the Soviet artists and art critics embracing the Republics of the Soviet Union.

The Union was founded started in 1932 to supersede the AKhRR. The integral Union was instituted in 1957. By January 1, 1976, the Union included 14,538 members.

In was officially disbanded at its 8th Congress in January 1992 after the dissolution of the Soviet Union, with its rights distributed over the corresponding unions in the post-Soviet states.

History
Prior to the Artists' Union of the USSR, there existed the Union of Soviet Artists (Союз советских художников, Soyuz sovetskikh khudozhnikov), which was founded by Alexander Grigoriev in Moscow in spring 1930. It included Moscow and Leningrad artists along with former members of the AKhRR. The first exhibition of the Union of Soviet Artists was held on 15 April 1931 in Moscow at the exhibition hall of the co-operative society Khudozhnik. The Union of Soviet Artists ceased to exist in 1932 following a government decision.

Following the resolution "On the Restructuring of Literary and Artistic Organizations" by the Central Committee of the Communist Party (Bolsheviks) on 23 April 1932, unions of Soviet artists were established in the Union and autonomous republics, in krais, in oblasts, and in cities to supersede previous organizations.

The first Congress of the Artists' Union of the USSR was convened in February–March 1957.

In Moscow they built the Central House of Artists which was opened in 1979.

Chairmen of the Artists' Union of the USSR
Konstantin Yuon - 1957–58
Sergei Gerasimov - 1958–64
Boris Ioganson - 1965–68
Yelena Belashova - 1968–71
Nikolai Ponomaryov - 1971–88
Valeri Sidorov - 1988–1992

Notes

References

Soviet art
Civic and political organizations based in the Soviet Union
1932 establishments in the Soviet Union
1992 disestablishments in Russia
Arts organizations established in 1932
Arts organizations disestablished in the 20th century
Trade unions in the Soviet Union